Del Bianco is a surname. Notable people with the surname include:

 Christian Del Bianco (born 1997), Canadian professional lacrosse goaltender
 Luigi Del Bianco (1892 - 1969), Italian-American sculptor, and chief carver of Mount Rushmore
 Paolo Del Bianco (born 1945), Italian architect